The Fourth Sall government has governed Senegal since 1 November 2020. It is the fourth government formed by Macky Sall.

Ministers 

 Mr. Sidiki Kaba  : Minister of the Armed Forces;
 Mr.   : Minister of Finance and Budget;
 Mr. Malick Sall  : Keeper of the Seals, Minister of Justice;
 Madame Aïssata Tall Sall  : Minister of Foreign Affairs and Senegalese Abroad;
 Mr Antoine Félix Abdoulaye Diome  : Minister of the Interior;
 Mr. Mansour Faye  : Minister of Infrastructure, Land Transport and Opening up;
 Mr. Amadou Hott  : Minister of Economy, Planning and Cooperation;
 Mrs. Mariama Sarr  : Minister of Public Service and Public Service Renewal;
 Mrs. Marie Khemesse Ngom Ndiaye  : Minister of Health and Social Action (Mr. Abdoulaye Diouf Sarr was Minister until his dismissal by President Sall on May 26, 2022);
 Madame   : Minister for Women, Family, Gender and Child Protection;
 Mr. Oumar Sarr  : Minister of Mines and Geology;
 Mr. Moussa Baldé  : Minister of Agriculture and Rural Equipment;
 Mr.   : Minister of Water and Sanitation;
 Mr.   : Minister of Tourism and Air Transport;
 Mr. Oumar Guèye  : Minister of Territorial Communities, Development and Regional Planning, Government Spokesman;
 Mr.   : Minister of National Education;
 Mr. Cheikh Oumar Anne  : Minister of Higher Education, Research and Innovation;
 Madame Sophie Gladima  : Minister of Petroleum and Energy;
 Mr. Samba Ndiobène Ka  : Minister of Community Development, Social and Territorial Equity;
 Mr. Moustapha Diop  : Minister of Industrial Development and Small and Medium Industries;
 Mr. Alioune Ndoye  : Minister of Fisheries and Maritime Economy;
 Mr. Samba Sy  : Minister of Labour, Social Dialogue and Relations with Institutions;
 Mr. Abdou Karim Sall  : Minister of Environment and Sustainable Development;
 Mr.   : Minister of Sports;
 Mr. Abdoulaye Seydou Sow  : Minister of Town Planning, Housing and Public Hygiene:
 Mrs. Aminata Assome Diatta  : Minister of Trade and Small and Medium Enterprises;
 Mr. Abdoulaye Diop  : Minister of Culture and Communication;
 Mr. Aly Saleh Diop  : Minister of Livestock and Animal Production;
 Mrs. Néné Fatoumata Tall  : Minister of Youth;
 Mrs.   : Minister of Microfinance and Social and Solidarity Economy;
 Mr. Dame Diop  : Minister of Employment, Vocational Training, Apprenticeship and Integration;
 Mr. Papa Amadou Ndiaye  : Minister of Handicrafts and Transformation of the Informal Sector;
 Mr. Yankhoba Diattara  : Minister of Digital Economy and Telecommunications;
 Mr. Moïse Diar Diégane Sarr  : Secretary of State to the Minister of Foreign Affairs and Senegalese Abroad, in charge of Senegalese Abroad;
 Mr. Mamadou Saliou Sow  : Secretary of State to the Keeper of the Seals, Minister of Justice, responsible for the Promotion of Human Rights and Good Governance;
 Mr. Mayacine Camara  : Secretary of State to the Minister of Infrastructure, Land Transport and Opening up, in charge of the rail network;
 Mrs. Victorine Ndeye  : Secretary of State to the Minister of Town Planning, Housing and Public Hygiene, in charge of Housing.

References

See also 

 Politics of Senegal

Sall
Government of Senegal
2020 establishments in Senegal
Cabinets established in 2020